"It's Not Me, It's You" is the sixth single of the 2009 album Awake by the Christian rock band Skillet, and is the sixth track on the album.

Background and meaning 
John Cooper mentioned in a fan interview that "It's Not Me, It's You" is his favorite song on the album because of its 'in your face' rock. He explains that it's about getting rid of a negative influence in your life, and finally realizing that it's them that is bringing you down.

Charts

References

2009 songs
2011 singles
Songs written by John Cooper (musician)
Song recordings produced by Howard Benson
Skillet (band) songs
Atlantic Records singles
Lava Records singles
Ardent Records singles